Kurtlykul (Qortlokül) is a rural locality (a village) and the administrative centre of Kurtlykulsky Selsoviet, Karaidelsky District, Bashkortostan, Russia. The population was 410 as of 2010. There are 3 streets.

Geography 
Kurtlykul is located 45 km southwest of Karaidel (the district's administrative centre) by road. Deushevo is the nearest rural locality.

References 

Rural localities in Karaidelsky District